Love by Design is a 2016 Taiwanese romantic comedy television series created and produced by Eastern Television. It stars Alan Ko, Allison Lin, Ahn Zhe and Beatrice Fang as the main cast. Filming began on May 12, 2016 and wrapped up on August 24, 2016. First original broadcast began on July 30, 2016 on TTV airing every Saturday night at 10:00-11:30 pm.

It is a remake of the South Korean drama Baby Faced Beauty, which first aired in 2011.

Synopsis
What would you if you were 34 years old and laid off from your job? Li Shu Fen gets fired from her job despite giving it many years of loyal service. Unable to find another job, Shu Fen uses her baby face to her advantage when she ends up lying about her age and taking an entry-level job as a 25-years-old rookie for a major clothing company. There, she meets the company president, who may catch her in her web of lies. How long can Shu Fen keep up her ruse to try to chase her dream of becoming a fashion designer?

Cast

Main cast
Alan Ko as Song Chong Ji 
Allison Lin as Li Shu Fen 
 as Chi Yu Hao 
Beatrice Fang as Jiang Yi Shu

Supporting cast
Chang Chin-lan as Li Shu Zhen 
Jason Hsu as Fu Zhu Ren 
 as Jiang Na La 
Claire Lee as Sun Hui Ting
 as Guo Min Ji 
Da Fei as Gao Ren Jie 
 as Xu Li Ping 
Liu Si Di as  Yu Mei Shun 
Yang Li-yin as Chen Ting Yu 
Ding Ning as Bai Cai Yun 
Emily Hung as Chi Yuan Yuan 
Angel Ho as Chi Ruo Yi

Cameos
 as Zhao Xuan Nan 
 as Ceng Qian Shi 
 as Xu Chun Lei 
 as An Xin Ya 
Zhuang Zhuang as Hao Qiang 
Tu Kai Xiang as personnel manager of The Style
Amanda Chou as Zhou Xiao Han 
Guan Jin Zong as Manager Huang
 as Song Cheng Xian 
 as Li Yi Wen 
Yvonne Yao as Yao Cai Ying

Soundtrack
"Says You 你說妳說" by Angel Ho 
"Yearn 念想" by Fong Wonder 
"Last to Realize 後知後覺" by Fong Wonder 
"Beautiful Day" by The Vanquish
"I'm Sorry, I Need You 對不起我需要你" by Audrey An 
"Have You Ever 你是否" by Audrey An 
"Goodbye Love 告別愛情" by Chen Yi Ting
"Test of Happiness 幸福的試卷" by You Hui Wen

Broadcast

Episode ratings

: The average rating calculation does not include special episode.

Awards and nominations

References

External links
Love by Design TTV Website 
Love by Design EBC Website  
 

2016 Taiwanese television series debuts
2016 Taiwanese television series endings
Eastern Television original programming
Taiwan Television original programming
Taiwanese romance television series
Taiwanese romantic comedy television series
Taiwanese television series based on South Korean television series